Saint-Germain-des-Prés is a commune in the Tarn department in southern France.

Its inhabitants are called Saint-Germinois.

See also
Communes of the Tarn department

References

Communes of Tarn (department)